Portrait of an African is an oil painting attributed to Allan Ramsay, created c. 1757–1760 and believed to be of a young Ignatius Sancho. 
It was previously believed to have depicted Olaudah Equiano and to have been painted by Joshua Reynolds c. 1780 with the title Portrait of a Negro Man. The painting featured as part of the "Art Everywhere" initiative in the UK in August 2013.

It was a gift from the art dealer Percy Moore Turner to the Royal Albert Memorial Museum, in Exeter, in 1943.

References

Scottish paintings
1750s paintings
Black people in art